Beaufort is a village and commune in the Haute-Garonne department in southwestern France.

Geography
The commune is bordered by four other communes: Sainte-Foy-de-Peyrolières to the northeast, Rieumes to the south, Montgras to the southwest, and finally by Sabonnères to the west.

Population

See also
Communes of the Haute-Garonne department

References

Communes of Haute-Garonne